Rebecca Stephens may refer to:

Rebecca Stephens (climber) (born 1961), British mountaineer and author
Rebecca Stephens (politician) (born 1983), Australian politician
Rebecca Stephens (singer) (born 1982), English indie pop performer also known as RiotBecki
Rebecca Stephens, one of the pseudonyms of Mary Millington (1945–1979)

See also
 Rebecca Stevens (disambiguation)